Barguzinsky Nature Reserve is the oldest of zapovedniks (nature reserves). It is located in Buryatia (Russia) on the west slope of the Barguzin Range, including the northeast shores of the Lake Baikal and a part of the lake itself. The name of the preserve (and the range) comes from the Barguzin River. It was created in 1916 to preserve and increase the numbers of Barguzin Sable (Martes zibellina). Mountainous and taiga landscapes are also being preserved.

The mountain landscape is intersected by glaciers and lakes.

Ecoregion and climate
The Barguzin Reserve is located in the Trans-Baikal conifer forests ecoregion.  This ecoregion covers a mountainous region of southern taiga stretching east, and south from the shores of Lake Baikal in southern Russia, reaching into northern Mongolia. The climate of Barguzin is a Subarctic climate with dry winters  (Köppen climate classification Subarctic climate(Dwc)). This climate is characterized by mild summers (only 1–3 months above ) and cold winters, having monthly precipitation less than one-tenth of the wettest summer month.

Flora and fauna
The Barguzin Nature Reserve is inhabited by moose (commonly called ‘elk’ in Eurasia), musk deer (known as kabarga), roe deer, Eurasian wild boar, Altai wapiti (known as ‘elk’ in North America), Ussuri brown bear, grey wolf, raccoon dogs, black-capped marmot, grouse, capercaillie, hare, Siberian lynx, yellow-throated marten. Additionally, there is Omul, sig, sturgeon, grayling, taimen (таймень), lenok (ленок) and other fish  which spawn in the waters of the reserve.

Taiga of cedar, fir and larch dominate at higher altitudes.

Related personnel
 Konstantin Zabelin (1885–1934)
 Zenon Svatosh (1886–1949)
 Evgeny Chernikin (1928–2009)

See also
 List of Russian Nature Reserves (class 1a 'zapovedniks')

References 

 Barguzinsky Reserve Accessed 2 September 2009

Nature reserves in Russia
Biosphere reserves of Russia
Geography of Buryatia
1916 establishments in the Russian Empire
Protected areas established in 1916
Zapovednik